The Global Undergraduate Awards (often referred to as the Junior Nobel Prize) is an academic awards program recognising undergraduate work. Prizes are awarded to 25 disciplines by a non-profit organisation under the patronage of the President of Ireland, Michael D. Higgins.

History 
The Global Undergraduate Awards (UA) was founded in 2008 in Dublin as The Undergraduate Awards. The programme was originally open to students from Ireland’s universities.

In 2012, UA expanded to accept submissions from every Third Level Institution on the Island of Ireland as well as the top twenty universities in Britain, USA and Canada.

In 2016, the UA Programme was split into seven regions: Africa & Middle East, Asia, Europe, Island of Ireland, Latin America, Oceania, US & Canada.

Process 
Entrants submit their work to one of 25 categories, which represent a wide range of academic disciplines: Architecture & Design, Art History & Theory, Business, Chemical & Pharmaceutical Sciences, Classical Studies & Archaeology, Computer Sciences, Earth & Environmental Sciences, Economics, Education, Engineering, History, Linguistics, Law, Life Sciences, Literature, Mathematics & Physics, Medical Sciences, Music, Film & Theatre, Nursing, Midwifery & Allied Healthcare, Philosophy, Politics & International Relations, Psychology, Anthropology & Cultural Studies, Sociology & Social Policy and Visual Arts.

The submissions are evaluated anonymously by a group of international academics. The top 10% of entries from each region in each category are named Highly Commended. The highest performing Highly Commended entrant from each region is named a Regional Winner of their category, while the best Highly Commended Entrant is named the Global Winner.

Global Winners
Entrants whose submission is selected as the best in their category are named Global Winners. These winners are invited to present their work in Dublin at the Global Undergraduate Awards Summit. Each winner is awarded with a gold medal.

References 

Awards established in 2008
Student awards